Amy Beattie  (born 8 September 1980) is an Australian women's international footballer who plays as a goalkeeper. She is a member of the Australia women's national football team. She was part of the team at the 2003 FIFA Women's World Cup.

References

1980 births
Living people
Australian women's soccer players
Australia women's international soccer players
Place of birth missing (living people)
2003 FIFA Women's World Cup players
Women's association football goalkeepers